Exclaim! is a Canadian music and entertainment publisher based in Toronto, which features in-depth coverage of new music across all genres with a special focus on Canadian and emerging artists. The monthly Exclaim! print magazine publishes 7 issues per year, distributing over 103,000 copies to over 2,600 locations across Canada. The magazine has an average of 361,200 monthly readers and their website, exclaim.ca, has an average of 675,000 unique visitors a month.

History
Exclaim! began as a discussion among campus and community radio programmers at Ryerson's CKLN-FM in 1991. It was started by then-CKLN programmer Ian Danzig,  together with other programmers and Toronto musicians. The goal of the publication was to support great Canadian music that was otherwise going unheralded. The group worked through 1991 to produce their first issue in April 1992, with monthly issues being produced since.

Ian Danzig has been the publisher of the magazine since its start. James Keast served as editor in chief until 2020.

The magazine had no official name for its first year of operations, with only the !☆@# logo appearing on the cover, and introduced the name Exclaim! after Danzig realized that its growth and appeal to advertisers were being limited by a reader tendency to refer to it as Fuck, and so the name Exclaim! was created.

The magazine is distributed across Canada as a free publication to campuses, community radio stations, bars, concert halls, record stores, cinemas, libraries, coffee shops, convenience stores and street vending boxes. It is also available with a home mail delivery subscription.

Danzig has attributed the magazine's survival in part to the fact that the internet ushered in an era of "free culture" in the late 1990s, meaning that the magazine never had to change its existing business model or alienate readers by introducing paywalls.

Website
The magazine's website is updated daily with the latest news, reviews, interviews, premieres and features. The site reaches over 675,000 unique users every month. There are also a number of recurring content series, including the monthly the Eh! List Spotify playlist, New Faves emerging artists, the Exclaim! Questionnaire, Music School, Canadian Cannabis Heroes coverage and more.

Exclaim! covers film festivals, such as the Toronto International Film Festival (TIFF), the Sundance Film Festival, Hot Docs Documentary Film Festival, and the Toronto After Dark Film Festival, and publishing interviews with a number of high-profile directors and movie stars. Its comedy section, similarly, focuses on profiles and interviews with established and up-and-coming stand-up comedians. The magazine's website also has contests where readers can enter for a chance to win various music, film and apparel prizes.

Social media 
Exclaim! posts daily on Facebook, Twitter and Instagram. Updates include news, features, reviews, interviews, giveaways and more.

Their YouTube channel, Exclaim! TV, includes video interviews with musicians, as well as unique live performances. Exclaim! also operates the No Future punk YouTube channel and the Aggressive Tendencies metal channel, which were both spearheaded by Bradley Zorgdrager.

Contributors
Many notable writers have worked for Exclaim! over the years, including Canadian radio personality Matt Galloway, Canadian punk chronicler and new media personality Sam Sutherland, hip-hop scribe and CBC Music producer Del Cowie, published author Andrea Warner, Canadian editor at The FADER Anupa Mistry, filmmaker Bruce LaBruce, and award-winning DJ and author Denise Benson.

Covers 
Some of the artists who have graced Exclaim!’s cover over the years include:
 D.O.A. (1995)
Ron Sexsmith (1997)
Nardwuar/The Evaporators (1998)
Stereolab (1999)
Neko Case (2000)
Weakerthans (2000)
Massive Attack (2003)
Metric (2003)
Converge (2004)
Arcade Fire (2004)
Caribou (2005)
Wolf Parade (2005)
Broken Social Scene (2006)
Yeah Yeah Yeahs (2006)
Outkast (2006)
The White Stripes (2007)
Tokyo Police Club (2008)
Tegan and Sara (2009)
Odd Future (2011)
The Weeknd (2011)
Grimes (2012)
Tame Impala (2012)
Kendrick Lamar (2012)
Daft Punk (2013)
Mac DeMarco (2014)
 St. Vincent (2014)
Drake (2016)
 Chance the Rapper (2016)
Daniel Caesar (2017)
Father John Misty (2017)
 Feist (2017)
 Mitski (2018)
Billie Eilish (2019)
Lizzo (2019)
Carly Rae Jepsen (2019)
Jessie Reyez (2020)

Collaborations
Since 2012, senior editor Stephen Carlick produces a week-in-review segment for !earshot 20, a nationally syndicated campus/community radio program available through the National Campus and Community Radio Association and produced by CFMH-FM in Saint John, New Brunswick. Staff writer Calum Slingerland took over producing the segment in 2017.

References

External links
 

1991 establishments in Ontario
Canadian music websites
Companies based in Toronto
Free magazines
Magazines established in 1991
Magazines published in Toronto
Monthly magazines published in Canada
Music magazines published in Canada
Music review websites
Online magazines published in Canada
Online music magazines published in Canada